Friess Lake is a 121-acre lake in the Village of Richfield, in Washington County, Wisconsin. It is a recreational lake with sport fishing and it is a no-wake lake. Little Friess Lake is connected to Friess Lake by a small channel.

History
The village of Richfield has six lakes and the largest one is Friess Lake. In 2008 the Wisconsin Department of Natural resources began trying to improve access to the lake. Grant money was used to make a boat launch on the 15-acre Little Friess Lake. Boaters can use the channel which leads from Little Friess to get to Friess Lake.

See also
 List of lakes in Wisconsin

References

Lakes of Washington County, Wisconsin
Lakes of Wisconsin
Tourist attractions in Washington County, Wisconsin